This uniform polyhedron compound is a composition of the 2 enantiomers of the snub dodecahedron.

The vertex arrangement of this compound is shared by a convex nonuniform truncated icosidodecahedron, with rectangular faces, alongside irregular hexagons and decagons, each alternating two different edge lengths.

Together with its convex hull, it represents the snub dodecahedron-first projection of the nonuniform snub dodecahedral antiprism.

References 
.

Polyhedral compounds